La mélodie des briques is the debut studio album by French rapper Nessbeal, released under the name NessBeal. It was released on March 20, 2006 by Nouvelle Donne in France. The album entered the French Albums Charts and peaked at number 24.

Track listing
Producer credits adapted from Discogs.

Chart performance

References

2006 debut albums
Nessbeal albums
Albums produced by Skread